Jesse Frohman is a photographer who lives and works in New York City.

Career 
Studying economics at the University of Michigan, Frohman discovered his passion for photography. With no formal training, he decided to try photography as a career and was hired by the photographer Irving Penn.

He has worked for magazines such as Vanity Fair, Vogue, Bazaar, V magazine, The New York Times Magazine, Interview, Rolling Stone, Spin, and i-D.

Advertising clients have included Barneys, Estée Lauder, Clinique, Levi's, Lucky Strike, Coty, The Limited, Sony, Geffen Records and Volvo.

Bibliography

Books

Interviews

Notes

External links 
 Jesse Frohman - Official website
 photographers limited editions - Online Gallery

Living people
American photographers
Year of birth missing (living people)
University of Michigan College of Literature, Science, and the Arts alumni